Attu may refer to:
Attu Island in Alaska, the westernmost island of the Aleutian Islands chain
The Battle of Attu, the primary land battle in the Aleutian Islands campaign of World War II, which took place on Attu Island in May 1943.
Attu Station, Alaska, a LORAN station on Attu Island
Attu (Greenland), a settlement in western Greenland
Attu (film), a 2017 Indian gangster film
An extinct dialect of the Aleut language
An island in Pargas, Väståboland, Finland
A breakfast dish in Andhra Pradesh, India; see List of Indian dishes